Poshmark is a social commerce marketplace where users can buy and sell new and secondhand fashion, home goods, and electronics. The platform has over 80 million users, with over 200M available listings. The company is headquartered in Redwood City, California, with offices in Canada (Vancouver), Australia (Melbourne), and India (Chennai). The company operates as an independent subsidiary of Naver Corporation since January 2023.

History

Prior to Poshmark, Manish Chandra founded the social shopping company Kaboodle. After selling Kaboodle to Hearst in 2007, Poshmark was founded in 2011 by Chandra, Tracy Sun, Gautam Golwala, and Chetan Pungaliya in Manish’s garage.

In November 2017, Poshmark announced that it had raised $87.5 million in Series D funding, at a valuation of nearly $600 million, in venture backed funding led by Singapore-based Temasek. Menlo Ventures, GGV Capital, Mayfield and others also participated, bringing their total to date to $160 million.

In a May 22, 2018, interview with Reuters, Poshmark's CEO and founder, Manish Chandra, stated that since Poshmark's launch sellers on the website had earned $1 billion selling clothing and accessories. Reuters reported that "much" of these earnings were "concentrated in a group of sellers making five, six and even seven figures" 

On January 14, 2021, Poshmark went public, at a valuation of over $3 billion, listed on the Nasdaq Stock Market under the symbol POSH. In October 2021, Poshmark announced its first acquisition, Suede One, a platform for checking the authenticity of sneakers.

In October 2022, South Korean internet conglomerate Naver Corporation agreed to buy Poshmark for a total enterprise value of US$1.2billion. The acquisition finalized in January 2023.

International expansion 
Poshmark announced its first international expansion to Canada in May 2019. As of May 2021, there are over 2.5 million Poshmark users in Canada who have listed nearly half a billion dollars worth of inventory.

In February 2021, Poshmark announced its expansion to Australia as part of its strategy to drive long-term growth through international expansion, starting with English-speaking countries. It later expanded into India.

References 

Companies based in Redwood City, California
American companies established in 2011
Retail companies established in 2011
Internet properties established in 2011
2011 establishments in California
Online marketplaces of the United States
2021 initial public offerings
Companies formerly listed on the Nasdaq
2023 mergers and acquisitions
American subsidiaries of foreign companies